Larry Geller (born August 8, 1939) is an American writer, hairstylist, and public speaker. He was a spiritual advisor and personal hairstylist to Elvis Presley. He "played a major role in shaping the King's iconic hair looks". Elvis hired him on April 30, 1964 during the filming of Roustabout. He became "the man in whom [Elvis] confided in matters of the spirit."

Career 
Geller's career began when he joined forces with famed hairdresser Jay Sebring, opening the first men's hair salon in America in 1959. This salon provided services like women's hair styling salons as opposed to the traditional barber shops.

Their salon, Sebring International, attracted Hollywood's A-list. Film stars, TV and recording artists such as Frank Sinatra, Paul Newman, Sammy Davis, Jr., Kirk Douglas, Marlon Brando, Peter Sellers, Steve McQueen, Henry Fonda, Robert Wagner, Glen Campbell, James Garner, Bobby Darin, Tony Bennett, Rock Hudson, Roy Orbison, Sam Cooke, and Jackie Gleason were among their clientele.

Personal hairstylist to Elvis Presley 
Beginning in 1964, Geller left Sebring to accompany Elvis and style his hair for entertainment engagements, including film productions, concert performances, and reception of guests at Graceland.  Their relationship went far deeper than hairstylist and client.  Geller was Elvis’ confidant and friend.  He brought Elvis many new age ideas on "[r]eligion, philosophy, ... life, and anything else you can think of", and books which contained them, which helped Elvis in his search for identity and purpose.

Geller styled Elvis’ hair for nearly a dozen movies: Roustabout, Girl Happy, Double Trouble, Easy Come, Easy Go, Frankie and Johnny, Harum Scarum, Paradise, Hawaiian Style, Tickle Me, Clambake, and Spinout.  Geller prepared Elvis’ hair for the last time for his funeral in August, 1977.

Personal life 

Geller was first married to Stevie, from 1963 to 1972. Geller remarried in 1995. He and his wife Shira lived in Los Angeles, and now live in Sedona, Arizona.  He has twin sisters. Elvis studied with him for years.

Notable appearances 
In November 2010, Geller appeared on the Elvis Cruise 2010, which sailed from Jacksonville to Nassau, Bahama on a Carnival Cruise Lines ship named the Carnival Fascination.

Bibliography 
  (with Joel Spector and Patricia Romanowski)
  (with Jess Stearn)
  A "small printing".

In popular culture 
 Played himself and was a technical advisor in Elvis, a 1979 TV movie with Kurt Russell
 Portrayed by Patrick O'Connell in Elvis and the Colonel: The Untold Story, a 1993 TV movie
 Portrayed by Robert C. Treveiler in Elvis, a 2005 TV mini-series with Jonathan Rhys Meyers

References

Further reading

External links 
 
 
 
 
 

1939 births
Writers from Elmira, New York
Writers from Los Angeles
Novelists from Arizona
Living people
Jewish American novelists
American male novelists
Novelists from New York (state)
21st-century American Jews